Fondo is a Barcelona Metro station in the municipality of Santa Coloma de Gramenet, in the northern part of the metropolitan area of Barcelona. It is served by two metro lines, L1 (red line), of which it is  the northern terminus, and L9 (orange line). It was built in 1992 under Camí Fondo de Badalona, in the neighbourhood of Fondo (hence the name), between Carrer Dalmau and Carrer Verdi.

It began to serve L9 (orange line) on 13 December 2009, providing a transfer to the first part of Line 9 that was opened, which initially ran between Can Zam and Can Peixauet.

Services

See also
List of Barcelona Metro stations

External links

Fondo at Trenscat.com

Railway stations in Spain opened in 2009
Barcelona Metro line 1 stations
Barcelona Metro line 9 stations
Railway stations in Spain opened in 1992
Transport in Santa Coloma de Gramenet
Railway stations located underground in Spain